Sphingobacterium arenae is a Gram-negative, non-spore-forming, short rod-shaped and non-motile bacterium from the genus of Sphingobacterium which has been isolated from sandy soil in Xinjiang in China.

References

Sphingobacteriia
Bacteria described in 2014